Burr Point is the easternmost point of mainland Northern Ireland and the island of Ireland. It is located in the townland of Ballyhalbert on the Ards Peninsula in County Down, at longitude 5.43ºW. It is a just over a mile (or 2 km) southeast of Ballyhalbert village.

The most easterly point is Big Bow Meel Island, a rock situated 900 metres off the Ards Peninsula, at longitude 5.42ºW.

References

Headlands of County Down